Isfjordosaurus is an extinct genus of ichthyopterygian marine reptile that lived during the Early Triassic. Fossils have been found on the island of Spitsbergen, part of the Svalbard archipelago off the northern coast of Norway. It was formally described by Ryosuke Motani in 1999 and contains the species Isfjordosaurus minor.

See also
 List of ichthyosaurs
 Timeline of ichthyosaur research

References

External links
 Isfjordosaurus at www.biolib.cz.

Fossils of Svalbard
Early Triassic reptiles of Europe
Ichthyosauromorph genera